Hutchence is an English surname and rare male given name, originates from the Pre-Germanic, which was introduced into Britain by the Normans after the Conquest of 1066, meaning "heart, mind or, spirit". Variant spellings include: Hutchen, Hutchin, Huchin, Hutchens, Hutchins, Huchings, Hutchinges and the most common Hugh.

People

 Ken Hutcherson (1952–2013), former National Football League linebacker, pastor of Antioch Bible Church in Kirkland, Washington
 Leslie Hutchinson (1900–1969), popular singer of the 1930s known as 'Hutch'
 Jesse Hutch (born 1981), actor
 Michael Hutchence (1960–1997), Australian vocalist for INXS
 James "Hutch" Hutchinson (born 1953), American bassist
 Shaun Hutchinson (born 1990), English football player in the Scottish Premier League
 Hutch Dano (born 1992), American actor
 Hutch Maiava (born 1976), rugby league player
 Hutch Hutchison (born c. 1942), an American politician

See also
Hutchins (surname)

References

Surnames